Nuru is a form of erotic massage with full body contact while both the masseur or masseuse and client are nude and coated with gel, traditionally made from seaweed.

Massage parlors attribute the technique to Japan, sometimes specifically to Kawasaki.

Because it entails lubricated full body contact between the person giving the massage and a client with a "happy ending", nuru massage falls under legal prohibitions against prostitution and brothels in many jurisdictions in Japan.

References 

Massage
Erotic massage
Japanese sex terms